The Kiss György Observatory is an observatory in Nagyszénás, Hungary.

History
It was grounded ca. 1980 by György Kiss, who was an amateur astronomer. When he died in 2000 István Zahorecz became the new director. Nowadays it has six telescopes: five reflecting and a refracting.

Directors
György Kiss (~1980–2000)
István Zahorecz (2000–2015)
Andrásné Fődi (2015–2016)
Tamás Sárkány (2016–2018)
Andrásné Fődi (2018–)

See also
 List of astronomical observatories

References

External links
History of the observatory (Hungarian)
Official website (Hungarian)

Astronomical observatories in Hungary
Buildings and structures in Békés County